Chennai has LGBTQIA cultures that are diverse concerning- socio-economic class, gender, and degree of visibility and politicisation. They have historically existed in the margins and surfaced primarily in contexts such as transgender activism and HIV prevention initiatives for men having sex with men (MSM) and trans women (TG).

List of organizations
Community development may be traced back to Sunil Menon's mapping of sexual networks among MSM and TG in the early 1990s and the subsequent formation of Sathe Honduran, the oldest group of its kind in the city and state to provide spaces for community support and sexual health, primarily for working-class MSM who visit public cruising spots.

There are currently over 15 groups in Chennai that work on LGBTQIA+ issues. Most of them are community-run initiatives, and some are NGOs.

Most of these groups are part of the informal Chennai Rainbow Coalition, formed in 2009, to jointly work towards visibility and advocacy. The group was expanded in 2014 to constitute the Tamil Nadu Rainbow Coalition, with membership from groups around the state.

Research 
Chennai has two research institutes that partner with community groups to conduct social science and biomedical research on LGBTQIA+ issues. The Centre for Sexuality and Health Research and Policy has published extensively on issues such as stigma and discrimination faced within the healthcare system by MSM and trans women, legal recognition of transgender identity, and other issues. The National Institute for Research on Tuberculosis (NIRT), in partnership with the community group Sahodaran and Harvard University School of Public Health carries out studies of mental health and HIV prevention] among men who have sex with men.

Significant Events in Chennai's LGBTQIA+ history

 1986: Screening of My Beautiful Laundrette at British Council – same-sex love depicted on the big screen for the first time in Chennai
 1993: Publication of Robert Oostvogels and Sunil Menon's mimeograph 'Men Who Have Sex With Men-Assessment of situation in Madras', prepared for the Government of Tamil Nadu
 1993: Sekar Balasubramaniam, a volunteer of Community AIDS Network (CAN), comes out as gay and HIV-positive. 
 1998: Sahodaran, first group for sexual minorities formed in Chennai
 1999: Mailing list gaychennai started on yahoogroups.com, the first listserv for the Chennai gay community
 1999: 'Queer Madras of the mid-80s' essay circulated on Indian LGBT lists 
 2003: Movenpick group formed (later renamed Orinam) the and mailing list started
 2004: First Chennai LGBT film festival  – Alliance-Francaise and SAATHII, with volunteer support from Movenpick/Orinam
 2005: The Many Colours of Love: LGBT documentary festival -  Alliance Francaise and SAATHII, with volunteer support from Movenpick/Orinam
 2006: Conference on thirthe d gender organised by Nalamdana
 2006: Orinam.net website launched
 2006: March for transgender rights when legislative assembly was in session in TN, organised by Sangama, THAA, SWAM, and other groups. Catalysed TN govt initiatives for transgender welfare.
 2006: Suicide by self-immolation of transgender teenager Pandiammal/Pandian, sexually abused by Chennai police
 2007: Madras High Court ruling in Jayalakshmi vs. State of Tamil Nadu by AP Shah
 2007: Sangama establishes Chennai chapter
 2007: Police advocacy on sexuality issues initiated by Tamil Nadu AIDS Control Society, implemented by community groups
 2007: Shakti Resource Centre formed, organises film series Desire and Sexuality at LV Prasad Film and TV Academy
 2008: Rose Venkatesan becomes first out trans woman talk show host on Chennai television
 2008: Double-suicide of Christy and Rukmini
 2008: Peer-counseling preparatory workshop (4 sessions: 8 June, 15 June, 22 June, July 6) of Shakthi Resource Centre in collaboration with Sahayatrika, Sahodaran, Orinam/MP, and Lotus Sangam.
 2008: 
 2009: Thirunangaithe .net, world's first matrimonial website for transwomen, launched by Kalki Subramaniam of Sahodari Foundation
 2009: Shakthi Resource Centre and Orinam/MP joint meeting Sept 12 to assess needs for peer counselling workshop
 2009: Peer-counseling multi-weekend course of Shakthi Resource Centre and Center for Counselling.
 2009: Public screening of Milk, organised by US Consulate at Film Chamber, as part of the Oscars film festival. 
2009: The Hindu, national newspaper published in Chennai, features editorial in support of LGBT rights post- Naz decision 
 2009: First Chennai Rainbow Pride March
 2009: Campaign for Open Minds launched
 2009: Chennai Rainbow Coalition started
 2009: First meet for parents of LGBT people in Chennai organised by Center for Counselling.
2009: Reverend George Zachariah delivers inspiring sermon at Gurukul Chapel calling on Christians to be inclusive of LGBT people
2009: Transwoman Narthaki Nataraj conferred Nrityachoodamani title by Krishna Gana Sabha
 2010: First edition of 'Our Children'/'Nam Kuzhanthaigal' booklet for parents of LGBT children released by Orinam
 2010: Chennai Dost formed
 2010: Launch of Tamil edition of the 'Love That Dare Speak Its Name' post-377 anthology by Sangama Chennai
2010: RIOV, social group for lesbians and bisexual women
 2011: Maatruveli (மாற்றுவெளி), Tamil academic journal brings out a special issue on sguest-edited, guest edited by Ponni and Aniruddhan Vasudevan
 2011: Chennai Dost website launched 
 2011: Chemistry Club campus groups launched by Chennai Dost
 2011: Public protests against homophobic remarks made by Union Health Minister Ghulam Nabi Azad 
 2011: Standard Deviation: first essay published on campus by a gay IIT-Madras student (then anonymous) makes waves
 2012: Orinam's Quilt (reading group) launched.
 2013: First officially sponsored LGBT sensitization event at IIT-Madras
 2013: Chennai Rainbow Film Festival, organised by Chennai Dost and Alliance Francaise
 2013: Reel Desires: Chennai International Queer Film Festival, organised by a collective of groups - Orinam, Goethe-Institut, RIOV, Nirangal, SAATHII,  East-West Center for Counselling, Shakthi Resource Centre, Oye!Chennai
 2013: Nirangal registered as an NGO (formerly Sangama Chennai)
 2013: Orinam launches 377 archives
 2014: Orinam launches 377letters, an online archive of letters to the Chief Justice of India opposing the Supreme Court verdict
 2014: First homophobic rally in Chennai, by Christians Against Homosexuality
 2014: Christians Against Homophobia started in response to Christians Against Homosexuality. Mailing list goes national.
 2014: Madras High Court ruling on 17 April 2014 'Jackuline Mary vs. The Superintendent of Police, Karur' cites NALSA April 2014 verdict to grant recognition to a police constable's right to self-identify as a woman and condemns physical/medical testing.
 2014: Tamil Nadu Rainbow Coalition formed
 2014: First book on Genderqueer in Tamil and fithe rst Tamil book on LGBTQIA from Srishti Madurai was released by BJP’s state general secretary Vanathi Srinivasan at the 6th Hindu spiritual service foundation’s sixth service fair, Chennai
 2014: Nir, queer feminist collective, formed
 2014: Vannam, IIT Madras queer collective formed
 2015: Tamil movie "I" by Shankar released, with transphobic depictions, community protests throughout state
 2015: Thirunangai (transwas  woman) Bhavana sexually assaulted by Pulianthope police after detention for an alleged crime (22 Jan)
 2015: Chennai Rainbow Film Festival 2015, organized by Chennai Dost conducted on 26–28 June.
 2015: TamilNadu LGBTIQ Facebook page Launched 
 2015: Tamil Nadu LGBTIQ Website cum NEWS portal launched
 2015: Tamil Nadu LGBTIQ organized online campaign for HIV Awareness on 1 December
 2016: Madras High Court questions Centre on abysmal state of LGBT rights in India
 2016: Community gathering, candlelight vigil and press meet leading up to Supreme Court decision on Curative Petition on 31 Jan
 2016: Valentine's Day 14th Special Programme for LGBTIQ Community People By Tamil Nadu LGBTIQ Movement 
 2016: On 6 March Srishti Madurai's new website launched by Dalit activist and Ambedkarite Ma. Venkatesan from BJP in the presence of Central Minister Pon Radhakrishnan, Vanathi Srinivasan, Aravindan Neelakandan, Joe D'Cruz and  Rashtriya Swayamsevak Sangh volunteers at Chennai.
 2016: Community gathering and press meet for trans inclusion in political parties campaigning in state elections
 2016: Queer and Allies Art Festival (QAAF) performances in Chennai,  organised by MIST, 8 May
 2016: LGBT activists hola d candlelight vigil in Chennai for Orlando victims 
 2016: Personal narrative of C Moulee, a techie and columnist from Chennai published his story on starting LGBT emplthe oyee networkthe  in workplace and about being gay in workplace. The article brought more awareness on being LGBT in Indian workplace. In August 2016, C Moulee was featured in India Today’s article – The Game Changers - on people inspiring change in the city of Chennai in India.
 2016: Panel discussion exploring the intersections between violence against women and violence targeting LGBTIQA+ communities at fourth edition of Reel Desires, Chennai International Queer Film Festival 2016.
 2017: LGBT Workplace — Expanding the Dialogue in India -  event that brought together employers, employees and activists to address challenges faced by the LGBTIQ community.
 2017: The Gabrielle Show – Chennai's First Ever Drag Show 
 2017: Community gathering and discussion on Online Safety and Harassment held as part of Chennai Rainbow Pride month
 2017: First-of-its-kind Tamil Lesbian Anthem - A part of a documentary titled "Ladies and Gentlewomen".
 2017: Launch of Queer Chennai Chronicles. An Independent Queer publishing house to chronicle LGBTQ lives in Chennai and to promote Queer writings in Tamil and English.
 2018: Release of first Vidupattavai (விடுபட்டவை), first Tamil novella written by an out Queer man. The book was co-published by Queer Chennai Chronicles and Karuppu Pradhigal and was released in the 41st Chennai Book Fair on 20 January 2018. The book was released by Tamil writer and actor Shobasakthi
2018: India's first Queer LitFest was organised by Queer Chennai Chronicles on 7 July 2018.
2021: Tamil Nadu High Court suggests school and university syllabi to include LGBTQ topics

LGBT workplace symposium
In May 2017, Chennai saw an event that brought together employers, employees and activists to discuss the challenges faced by the queer (LGBTIQ) community at work places. This LGBT workplace symposium, titled LGBT Workplace — Expanding the Dialogue in India, was hosted by RELX in association with the Amsterdam-based Workplace Pride Foundation and the Bengaluru-based Solidarity Foundation, with Orinam and Community Business as community partners.

Few of the panellists were Michiel Kolman, a senior vice president at Elsevier, Parmesh Shahani, head of Godrej India Culture Labs, Sunil Menon, founder of NGO Sahodaran, lawyer Poongkhulali Balasubramanian, Ritesh Rajani, an openly gay HR diversity professional, and also journalist Lavanya Narayan.

See also

 LGBT culture in India
 Kothi (gender)
Tamil Sexual Minorities

References